Soybean agglutinins (SBA) also known as soy bean lectins (SBL) are lectins found in soybeans.  It is a family of similar legume lectins.  As a lectin, it is an antinutrient that chelates minerals.  In human foodstuffs, less than half of this lectin is deactivated even with extensive cooking (boiling for 20 minutes).

Characteristics
SBAs have a molecular weight of 120 kDa and an isoelectric point near pH 6.0  SBA preferentially binds to oligosaccharide structures with terminal α-helix or β-sheet linked N-acetylgalactosamine, and to a lesser extent, galactose residues. Binding can be blocked by substitutions on penultimate sugars, such as fucose attached to the penultimate galactose in blood group B.   Soybean lectin has a metal binding site, which is conserved among beans.

SBA binds to intestinal epithelial cells, causing inflammation and intestinal permeability, and is a major factor in acute inflammation from raw soybean meal fed to animals.
 
Studies on rats fed SBA had complex changes: With increasing doses of soybean agglutinin, the activities of aspartate aminotransferase linearly increased in plasma and decreased plasma insulin content without decrease in blood glucose levels.  Consumption of soybean agglutinin resulted in a depletion of lipid and an overgrowth of small intestine and pancreas in rats. Meanwhile, poor growth of spleen and kidneys and pancreatic hypertrophy was observed in the soybean agglutinin-fed rats.

Applications
An important application for SBA is the separation of pluripotent stem cells from human bone marrow. Cells fractionated by SBA do not produce graft vs host disease and can be used in bone marrow transplantation across histocompatibility barriers.

SBA binding has been investigated as a useful tool for detection of stomach cancer.

References

Lectins
Stem cells
Soy products